Pristobaeus is a genus of jumping spiders that was first described by Eugène Louis Simon in 1902.

Species
 it contains fifteen species, found only in Oceania and Asia:
Pristobaeus albofasciatus (Peckham & Peckham, 1907) – Borneo
Pristobaeus arboreus (Peckham & Peckham, 1907) – Borneo
Pristobaeus beccarii (Thorell, 1881) – Indonesia (Moluccas) to Australia
Pristobaeus clarus (Roewer, 1938) – New Guinea
Pristobaeus dearmatus (Thorell, 1881) – Australia (Queensland)
Pristobaeus discedens (Kulczyński, 1910) – Papua New Guinea (Bismarck Arch.)
Pristobaeus fuscoannulatus (Strand, 1911) – Indonesia (Aru Is.)
Pristobaeus jocosus Simon, 1902 (type) – India, Indonesia (Sulawesi)
Pristobaeus kuekenthali (Pocock, 1897) – Indonesia (Moluccas)
Pristobaeus namosi (Berry, Beatty & Prószyński, 1996) – Fiji
Pristobaeus nemoralis (Peckham & Peckham, 1907) – Borneo
Pristobaeus taveuniensis (Patoleta, 2008) – Fiji
Pristobaeus trigyrus (Berry, Beatty & Prószyński, 1996) – Caroline Is.
Pristobaeus vanuaensis (Patoleta, 2008) – Fiji
Pristobaeus vitiensis (Patoleta, 2008) – Fiji

References

Salticidae genera
Salticidae
Spiders of Asia
Spiders of Oceania